CIDO-FM, branded as Creston Community Radio, is a community radio station broadcasting with an effective radiated power of 20 watts in the Southern Interior town of Creston, British Columbia, Canada. The non-commercial station, airing on 97.7 FM, is staffed entirely by members and volunteers of the Creston Community Radio Society.

History
The Society was founded in 2001 to provide locally based broadcasting in the Creston Area, after the Creston Valley's only commercial radio station discontinued its local broadcasting. The station branded itself as "977 CIDO, Creston Valley's Community Radio Station" and promoted itself as "A different view on a familiar valley."

CIDO's broadcast application to the Canadian Radio-television and Telecommunications Commission was approved in February 2005, allowing the society to broadcast as an English-language FM type B community radio station.

The station was one of several new community radio stations launched in the Kootenay region in the 2000s. Others include CJLY-FM in Nelson, CFAD-FM in Salmo, CJHQ-FM in Nakusp and CHLI-FM in Rossland.

References

External links
 Creston Community Radio
 
 

IDO
IDO
Radio stations established in 2005
2005 establishments in British Columbia